Anacridium aegyptium, the Egyptian grasshopper or Egyptian locust, is a species of insect belonging to the subfamily Cyrtacanthacridinae.

Subspecies
 Anacridium aegyptium var. rubrispinum Bei-Bienko, 1948 - Anacridium rubrispinum Bei-Bienko, 1948

Distribution
This quite common species is present in most of Europe, the Afrotropical realm, eastern Palearctic realm, the Near East, and North Africa, and recently seen in Cape Town, South Africa.

Habitat
These grasshoppers inhabit trees and shrubs, scrub land, maquis, and orchards in warm and bright environments, at an elevation from sea level to 1,500 m.

Description

Anacridium aegyptium is one of the largest European grasshoppers. Their bodies are usually gray, brown, or olive-coloured, and their antennae are relatively short and robust. The tibiae of the hind legs are blue, while the femora are orange. The hind femora have characteristic dark marks. They are easily identifiable also by the characteristic eyes with vertical black and white stripes. Their pronota show a dorsal orange stripe and several white small spots. The wings are clear with dark marks.

Biology
This species is a folivore, essentially feeding on leaves of various plants. It is a solitary species, not harmful to crops. Adults can mainly be encountered in August and September, but they are active throughout the year. After mating, these grasshoppers overwinter as adults. Spawning occurs in spring just under the soil surface and the nymphs appear in April. These grasshoppers undergo several molts. The nymphs have the appearance of the adults, their color varies from yellow to bright green and ocher and the wings are absent or small, as they are gradually developed after each molting.

Gallery

References

Linnaeus, 1764 : Museum S.R.M. Ludovicae Ulricae reginae Svecorum, Gothorum, Vandalorum,… In quo animalia raroria, exotica, imprimis Insecta et Conchilia describuntur et determinantur Prodromi instar editum.

External links
 Orthoptera.speciesfile.org
 Waste Ideal

Acrididae
Grasshoppers described in 1758
Taxa named by Carl Linnaeus
Articles containing video clips
Orthoptera of Europe